Scient Institute of Technology (SNTI) is an engineering college in Ibrahimpatnam, Hyderabad, India.  College is popularly known as SCIENT (SIT) - is the first Engineering College in Ibrahimpatnam on the Sagar Road established in 2001 and is affiliated to JNTU, Hyderabad. It is located in 32 acres of campus. It is approximately 25 km from Hyderabad.

The Institute is offering 5 Under Graduate Programs B.Tech. (Computer Science & Engineering, Electronics & Communication Engineering, Civil Engineering and Electrical & Electronics Engineering, Mechanical Engineering) and MBA & M.Tech Programmes at PG level. 

Engineering colleges in Hyderabad, India
Educational institutions established in 2001
2001 establishments in Andhra Pradesh